James Southwell (born 1 July 1988) is an Australian guitar player, singer, songwriter. In addition to his releases, he has toured Australia and New Zealand extensively from 2006 playing in excess of 2000 shows, including many festival appearances.

Biography

Early life
Born and raised in Bowning, New South Wales, James Southwell is the son of Tony Southwell, he was raised by Tony and his second wife Michelle along with James' siblings, after his father and his first wife, Penny were divorced early in James' life. James has four sisters (Natalie, Kate, Shelby and Daytona) and one brother (Creepy Uncle Craigy-boy Southwell). Southwell first became interested in playing guitar when he received one for Christmas when he was seven years old from his mother & father and his uncle, Rick Gooding.
James now lives in Canberra, ACT with his wife Alanna, and daughters Magnolia & Lenora.

Musical career
Southwell left school in 2005 to pursue his dream of being a full-time guitar player. His first album, Dark Angel, was recorded at Kevin Borich's studio in December 2005. Mark Kennedy on drums, Harry Brus on bass and Borich played on Dark Angel as well as Phil Emmanuel & Mal Eastick, who both featured on the cover of Stevie Wright’s "Guitar Band" along with Southwell and Borich. Dark Angel was successful for Southwell which resulted in a 76 show tour with Kennedy and Brus. Since the release of Dark Angel, Southwell has been in constant demand at music venues and festivals. He has had five more releases since Dark Angel, James Southwell & the Fallen Angels, Pieces of James, James Southwell Band live at the Sydney Blues & Roots festival DVD, the "Walkin' Now" single, and his 2017 release, "Where The Wind Blows - The Dockside Sessions.

Influences
Kevin Borich, Phil Manning, Lobby Loyde, George Harrison, Geoff Achison, John Lennon, Mal Eastick, Johnny Lang.

Festival appearances
 Australian Blues Festival 2008 
 Canberra Festival 2009 
 Summernats 21 2008 
 Yass Heritage Festival 2009
 Yass Festival 2006, 2007, 2008, 2009, 
 Australian Music Extravaganza 2010
 Blues On Broadbeach 2006, 2007, 2009, 2011, 
 Blues Music Day Wollongong Blues Club 2015
 Great Southern Blues & Rockabilly Festival 2009, 2015
 Redlands-Bayside Blues Festival October 2014.
 Blues at the Briars January 2015.  
 Agnes Water Blues & Rock Festival Feb 2015.
 Airlie Beach Music Festival November 2015. 
 Thredbo Blues Festival 2008, 2009, 2010, 2016, 2017 
 Bay of Islands Jazz & Blues Festival New Zealand 2008, 2015, 2016, 2019
 Sydney Blues & Roots Festival 2009, 2011, 2014, 2015, 2016
 Wangaratta Jazz & Blues Festival 2015, 2016
 Untapped Festival 2018, 2019
 Red, White, Amber & Blues Festival 2019

Side projects
Southwell has been touring with Australian rock icon Angry Anderson (Ex Rose Tattoo) for the past 10 years as "Angry Anderson with the James Southwell Band". He has a popular festival band, "Manning (Phil Manning) Wilson (Chris Wilson) Southwell (James Southwell) Band"  He has also toured with Australian idol winner Kate DeAraugo. He has played with Kevin Borich, Phil Manning, Chris Wilson, Lachlan Doley, and a host of well known Australian musicians. His latest project teams him up with the New Orleans bass player Charlie Wooton, as the "James Southwell Band featuring Charlie Wooton"

Latest recording
Southwell traveled to Maurice Louisiana in June 2016 to record a new original album at the famed Dockside Studio. Charlie Wooton produced and plays bass on this recording, with Doug Belote on drums, Michael Lemmler on keys, Jason Ricci on harmonica/vocals, Rafael Pereira on percussion, Jamison Ross on backing vocals. Paul Wooton on backing vocals, Andrew Gregory on clapping, Dave Farrell engineer. This album is set to be released in late 2016.

Discography
 2006 Dark Angel 
 2009 James Southwell & the Fallen Angels 
 2013 Pieces of James 
 2015 Walkin' Now (Single)
 2015 James Southwell Band "Live" at the 2014 Sydney Blues & Roots Festival DVD
 2016 James Southwell Band "Live" at the 2016 Thredbo Blues Festival DVD 
 2016 James Southwell Band "Live" at the 2016 Thredbo Blues Festival CD
 2017 Where The Wind Blows, The Dockside Sessions

Music videos
 James Southwell, "Guitar Band" 2006
 James Southwell & Barry Harvey, "Beast of Burden" 2013
 James Southwell Band, "Wild Thing" 2014 
 James Southwell Band, "I can Tell" 2014
 James Southwell, "Walkin' Now" 2015
 James Southwell Band featuring Charlie Wooton 2015

References
 

 

 

1988 births
Living people
Australian guitarists
Australian male singer-songwriters
21st-century Australian singers
21st-century guitarists
21st-century Australian male singers
Australian male guitarists